Sibley Miller is the author of the Breyer Wind Dancers series of children's books, a fantasy series for early readers about magical horses with wings. The author also writes novels for teens, but used a pseudonym for this series.

Bibliography
 If Wishes Were Horses, Feiwel & Friends, 2008
 Horse Happy, Feiwel & Friends, 2008
 The Horse Must Go On, Feiwel & Friends, 2008
 Horses' Night Out, Feiwel & Friends, 2008
 Heads Up, Horses!, Feiwel & Friends, 2009
 Horses Her Way, Feiwel & Friends, 2009
 A Horse, Of Course!, Feiwel & Friends, 2009
 Hungry as a Horse, Feiwel & Friends, 2009
 A Horse’s Best Friend, Feiwel & Friends, 2011
 Merry-Go-Horses, Feiwel & Friends, 2011
 Horsey Trails, Feiwel & Friends, 2011
 Magic Horses—or Not?, Feiwel & Friends, 2011

References

Living people
American women children's writers
American writers
American children's writers
Year of birth missing (living people)
21st-century American women